The Constitutional Assembly of Latvia was independent Latvia's first elected legislative body. Its main task was creating the constitution of Latvia, the Satversme, which is still in effect to this day. The Speaker of Assembly was Jānis Čakste, who later became the first President of Latvia. The assembly functioned from May 1, 1920, until November 7, 1922, when the 1st Saeima convened.

Electing the Constitutional Assembly
On August 19, 1919, People's Council of Latvia issued the law about elections of Constitutional Assembly. Elections were open to male and female citizens who were older than 21, no minimal vote percentage was set, so many small parties were elected.

After the end of Latvian War of Independence in January, 1920 Constitutional Assembly elections were quickly organized and held on April 17–18, 1920 when the people of Latvia voted in universal, equal, direct and proportional elections. 25 parties competed for 150 seats.

84.9% of eligible voters participated (677, 084 people). There were 57 candidate lists covering 5 regional constituencies and 16 parties won seats in the Assembly. One hundred fifty members, including 5 women, were elected. The most successful parties were the Latvian Social Democratic Workers' Party (57 seats), Latvian Farmers' Union (26 seats) and Latgalian Farmers Party (17 seats). The remainder of the seats went mostly to ethnic minorities — Committee of the German Baltic Parties, Democrats Union, Polish Party of Latvia and the Worker's Party, Jewish parties and others.

The first meeting of the Assembly took place on May 1, 1920, at Riga, in the House of the Livonian Noble Corporation which houses Latvian Parliament up to this day. The Constitutional Assembly drafted the basic law of the state — the Satversme — as well as other laws. It adopted a law on agrarian reform, a law on the election of the Saeima (Parliament), laws about the State flag, State coat of arms, national anthem and other laws. The Constitutional Assembly had 21 standing committees. It held 213 plenary sessions and adopted 205 laws and 291 regulations having the force of law.

List of deputies

 Arturs Alberings 
 Mārtiņš Antons
 Pauls Ašmanis
 Jānis Bankavs
 Ernests Bauers
 Jānis Beļinskis
 Rūdolfs Benuss
 Kārlis Benze
 Arveds Bergs
 Krišjānis Berķis 
 Īzaks Berss
 Andrejs Bērziņš 
 Donats Bicāns
 Roberts Bīlmanis 
 Jānis Birznieks
 Krišs Birznieks
 Erasts Bite
 Ādolfs Bļodnieks 
 Aleksandrs Bočagovs 
 Kārlis Bojārs
 Augusts Briedis
 Miķelis Bružis
 Kristaps Bungšs
 Ansis Buševics
 Jānis Cālītis
 Hugo Celmiņš
 Jūlijs Celms
 Zelma Cēsniece-Freidenfelde 
 Fēlikss Cielēns
 Ruvins Cvi
 Jānis Čakste
 Jēkabs Dārznieks 
 Kārlis Dēķens
 Vilis Dermanis
 Viktors Dombrovskis 
 Jānis Druģis
 Morduhs Dubins
 Kārlis Dzelzītis
 Kristaps Eliass
 Vilhelms Firkss
 Leopolds Fišmanis
 Markus Gailītis
 Ignats Gigels
 Jānis Goldmanis
 Jānis Goliass
 Eduards Grantskalns 
 Valdis Grēviņš
 Oto Hasmanis
 Jakovs Helmanis 
 Vilis Holcmanis
 Kārlis Irbe
 Ēvalds Ivanovs 
 Roberts Ivanovs
 Fricis Jansons
 Jēkabs Jansons
 Aleksandrs Jaunbērzs 
 Heliodors Jozans
 Klāra Kalniņa
 Augusts Kalniņš
 Bruno Kalniņš
 Miķelis Kalniņš
 Nikolajs Kalniņš
 Pauls Kalniņš
 Staņislavs Kambala 
 Kārlis Kasparsons
 Kārlis Kellers
 Juris Kēmanis
 Francis Kemps
 Jezups Kindzulis 
 Ādolfs Klīve
 Pēteris Klūge
 Egons Knops
 Dāvids Komisārs 
 Pēteris Kotans
 Vincents Kursītis 
 Andrejs Kuršinskis
 Alberts Kviesis
 Antons Laizāns
 Pauls Laizāns
 Jakovs Landaus
 Rūdolfs Lapsa	
 Apolonija Laurinoviča 
 Jezups Laurinovičs
 Roberts Lauris
 Pēteris Lazdāns
 Jānis Lībietis
 Kārlis Lībtāls
 Rūdolfs Lindiņš
 Edvīns Magnuss
 Zigfrīds Meierovics 
 Pāvels Meļņikovs
 Fricis Menders
 Pauls Mincs
 Ernests Morics 
 Juris Naķelis
 Aleksandrs Neibergs 
 Oto Nonācs
 Arons Nuroks
 Staņislavs Ozoliņš 
 Arturs Ozols
 Juris Pabērzs
 Roberts Pasils
 Kārlis Pauļuks
 Fjodors Pavlovs
 Andrejs Petrevics
 Elza Pliekšāne (Aspazija)
 Jānis Pliekšāns (Rainis) 
 Teodors Plūme
 Emīls Prauliņš
 Vladimirs Presņakovs 
 Jānis Purgalis
 Kārlis Puriņš
 Izaks Rabinovičs 
 Eduards Radziņš
 Gustavs Reinhards
 Artūrs Reisners
 Juris Riekstiņš
 Miķelis Rozentāls
 Antons Rubins
 Jānis Rubulis
 Ansis Rudevics
 Teofils Rudzītis
 Hermanis Salnis
 Pēteris Sauleskalns 
 Indriķis Segliņš
 Valērija Seile
 Pēteris Siecenieks 
 Andrejs Sīmanis
 Kārlis Skalbe
 Nikolajs Skangelis 
 Emīls Skubiķis
 Marģers Skujenieks 
 Eduards Strautnieks
 Juris Strazdiņš
 Fricis Šaberts
 Pauls Šīmanis
 Jānis Šterns
 Arveds Švābe
 Jānis Taube
 Vilis Tode
 Eduards Tomass 
 Francis Trasuns
 Jezups Trasuns
 Žano Trons
 Odums Turkopuls 
 Kārlis Ulmanis 
 Pēteris Ulpe
 Oskars Valdmanis 
 Jānis Vārsbergs
 Andrejs Veckalns
 Antons Velkme
 Jānis Velmers
 Fricis Venevics
 Berta Vesmane
 Fridrihs Vesmanis 
 Artūrs Vīgants
 Jānis Vilsons
 Jānis Višņa
 Pēteris Zadvinskis 
 Voldemārs Zamuels
 Jānis Zankevics
 Pēteris Zeibolts
 Pēteris Zvagulis
 Artūrs Žers

References

External links 
 http://helios-web.saeima.lv/Informacija_eng/likumdeveju_vesture.html

Political history of Latvia
Legal history of Latvia
Latvian constitutional law
Independence of Latvia